Calytrix similis is a species of plant in the myrtle family Myrtaceae that is endemic to Western Australia.

It usually blooms between January and May producing pink star-shaped flowers.

Found on flats in a small area along the south coast in the Great Southern region of Western Australia where it grows on sandy soils over laterite.

References

Plants described in 1987
similis
Flora of Western Australia